Vassilis Vassili (Greek: Βασίλης Βασίλη; born 1964) is a Greek contemporary visual artist working primarily in sculpture.

In Greek Cyprus he worked with several other sculptors to create public art for the Cypriot community, most notably his stone display in Limassol.

Early life 
Vassili studied at The School of Fine Arts in Athens under professor E. Panourias and Theodoros Papagiannis from 1992 to 1997. In 1999 he won a scholarship from The Greek Foundation of Scholarships and from Onassis Foundation. He moved to United States. In 2001 he received a Masters of Fine Arts from the Pennsylvania Academy of the Fine Arts

Career 
From 2004 to 2013  Vassilis taught at the Technological Institution of Athens, Greece. From 2006 to 2008 he taught at the Department of Fine Arts at the University of West Macedonia in Florina,  Greece. In 2013 he moved to Canada where he lives with his family.

Public art works 
Vassili created permanent public art installations in the following places:
 1995- Konitsa, Greece
 1996- University of Patra, Greece
 1996- Iannena, Greece
 1996- Dreieih- Frankfurt, Germany
 2000- Lemesos, Cyprus
 2000- Kalamata, Greece
 2002- Abington Art Center, Philadelphia, USA
 2004- Train Station Pefkakia, Athens, Greece
 2004-  Dionyssos, Attica, Greece
 2006- Piraeus, Greece
 2006- Katerini, Greece
 2006- Antalya, Turkey
 2008- Aniksi Attica, Greece
 2011- Paros Island, Greece
 2011- Iannena, Greece
 2011- Polis Crysoxous, Cyprus
 2015- Halifax, Nova Scotia, Canada
 2016- Nashua, New Hampshire, USA
 2016- Saranda, Albania
 2017- Ayia Napa, Cyprus
2018- Herakleion Crete. 
2019- BenQ Foundation, Taiwan.
2020- Uttarayan Art Foundation, Vadodara , India..

Exhibitions
Vassilis has had exhibitions at the following institutions: Burgerhaus, Dreieich, Frankfurt, Germany (1998); “Epoxes” Gallery, Athens, Greece (1998); Pennsylvania Museum of Fine Arts, Philadelphia, USA (2001); Titanium Gallery, Athens, Greece (2003); Titanium Gallery Athens Greece (2005); Art Gallery Kaplanon Athens Greece (2008).

Selected group exhibitions include:
 1995- M. Merkouri Foundation, Athens, Greece
 1995- State Bank of Greece Athens, Greece
 1996- M. Merkouri Foundation Athens, Greece
 1997- National Gallery, Athens, Greece
 1997- Outdoor show, Pllaka, Athens, Greece
 1997- “Epoxes” Gallery, Athens, Greece
 1997- Outdoor show, Salonica, Greece
 1998- Global Stone Workshop, Gothenburg, Sweden
 1998- Drawing show, Svetsingen, Germany
 1998- City Hall, Psyxiko, Athens, Greece
 2000- Destination Philadelphia, Convention Centre, Philadelphia, USA
 2001- Snapshots, Beaver College Art Gallery, Glenside, Pennsylvania, USA
 2001- 5 into 1, Philadelphia Sculptors’ Show. Moore College of Art, Philadelphia, USA
 2001- Artower Agora, Athens, Greece
 2002-Wiesbaden, Germany
 2003- The Burnished Chariot, NewLondon, C.T, USA
 2003- Its Kale, Giannena, Greece
 2006- Gallery Crysa Katerini Greece
 2007- Art Gallery Kaplanon Athens Greece
 2008- Alexander S. Onassis Foundation, Greece
 2009- Art Gallery Kaplanon Athens Greece
 2010- Art Space Gazi. Athens

External links

 
 [http://www.glyptothiki.gr/βασίλη-βασίλης-vassili-vassilis.aspx
 
 
 
 
 
 
 
 
 
 
 

Greek sculptors
Living people
1964 births